India participated in the 1958 Asian Games—Third Asian Games, held in the Tokyo, Japan from 24 May to 1 June 1958. Indian athletes achieved total 13 medals with 5 golds and finished at the seventh spot in a medal table.

Medal table

Medalists

References

Nations at the 1958 Asian Games
1958
Asian Games